Badamanavarthekaval or BM Kaval is a village in the southern state of Karnataka, India. It is located in the outskirts of Bangalore situated in Bangalore South Taluk of Bangalore Urban district.

Land related legal issues
Since this village is located in the outskirts of Bangalore, there are many legal issues related to land allotment. Many layouts formed on Agricultural land was removed. There was an attempt to regularise Layouts formed on Government lands, Lakes and Forest Area. Adding to the irregularities, the Deputy Commissioner of Bangalore Urban district had awarded 285 acre of land to Khoday Group and Government of Karnataka approached High Court to stall the order. Once home to peacocks, deer, rabbits, jackals and a variety of winged creatures. However, the verdant forest, in Bangalore South region, has been turned into a concrete jungle, thanks to Bagair Hukum land scheme, putting its rich flora and fauna in peril. Due to increasing incidents of Forest fire, Poaching of animals, Forest department uses drones for constant monitoring and also avoided entry to Birders as a precautionary measure. A Film City was also planned at Roerich Estate and High Court stalled the land Transfer process

Demographics

2011

References

Villages in Bangalore Urban district